Klimentov is a Slavic masculine surname, its feminine counterpart is Klimentova. It may refer to
Andrei Platonov, pen name of the Russian writer Andrei Klimentov (1899–1951)
Daria Klimentová (born 1971), Czech ballet dancer, teacher and photographer